The Government of the 23rd Dáil or the 18th Government of Ireland (9 March – 14 December 1982) was the government of Ireland formed after the February 1982 general election. It was a minority Fianna Fáil government led by Charles Haughey as Taoiseach, reliant on the support of the Sinn Féin The Workers' Party and Independent TD Tony Gregory.

The 18th Government lasted for  days.

18th Government of Ireland

Nomination of Taoiseach
The 23rd Dáil first met on 9 March 1982. In the debate on the nomination of Taoiseach, Fianna Fáil leader Charles Haughey, and Fine Gael leader and outgoing Taoiseach Garret FitzGerald were both proposed. The nomination of Haughey was carried with 86 in favour and 79 against. Haughey was appointed as Taoiseach by president Patrick Hillery.

Members of the Government
After his appointment as Taoiseach by the president, Charles Haughey proposed the members of the government and they were approved by the Dáil. They were appointed by the president on the same day.

Attorney General

On 9 March 1982, Patrick Connolly SC was appointed by the president as Attorney General on the nomination of the Taoiseach. Connolly resigned on 17 August after Malcolm MacArthur, who had been a house-guest of Connolly's, was arrested for murder. On 18 August 1982, John L. Murray SC was appointed by the president as Attorney General on the nomination of the Taoiseach.

Ministers of State
On 9 March, the Government appointed Bertie Ahern on the nomination of the Taoiseach to the post of Minister of State at the Department of the Taoiseach with special responsibility as Government Chief Whip. On 23 March, the Government appointed the other Ministers of State.

Confidence in the Government
On 1 July 1982, the Dáil voted on a motion of confidence the Taoiseach placed in the government. The motion was carried by a vote of 84 to 77.

On 4 November 1982, the Dáil voted on a motion of confidence the Taoiseach placed in the government. The motion was defeated, with 80 votes in favour to 82 against, with the Workers' Party voting against Haughey, and Tony Gregory abstaining. After the vote, Haughey sought a dissolution of the Dáil, which was granted by the president. A second general election of that year was held on 24 November 1982 for the 24th Dáil.

See also
Dáil Éireann
Constitution of Ireland
Politics of the Republic of Ireland

References

1982 establishments in Ireland
1982 disestablishments in Ireland
23rd Dáil
Cabinets established in 1982
Cabinets disestablished in 1982
Governments of Ireland
Minority governments